Number 11, #11 or variations may refer to:

 Number 11 (novel), by Jonathan Coe
 Number 11, a 1952 painting by Jackson Pollock, later known as Blue Poles
 11 (number), a natural number
 11 Downing Street, the residence of the British Chancellor of the Exchequer
 In the batting order (cricket), the last batsman, sometimes referred to as the last man Jack

See also
Eleven (disambiguation)